Liu Yingchen (born 15 January 1993) is a Chinese footballer who currently plays for Chinese club Dalian Jinshiwan.

Club career
Liu Yingchen started his professional football career in 2011 when he was promoted to Chinese Super League side Dalian Shide's first team squad. He moved to Dalian Aerbin in 2013 after Dalian Shide dissolved and played for the reserve team due to transfer slot limit. Liu officially joined Dalian Aerbin in the 2014 season. On 11 April 2015, he made his senior debut in a 1–0 home win against Hunan Billows, coming on as a substitute for Bruno Meneghel in the stoppage time. He made another league appearance on 23 May 2015 in a 4–1 home win over Beijing BIT, also coming on Bruno Meneghel in the stoppage time.

On 5 February 2016, Liu transferred to Dalian Transcendence who newly promoted to China League One. On 13 April 2016, he made his debut in a 3–0 away defeat against Chengdu Qbao in the 2016 Chinese FA Cup. He made his league debut in the last match of season in a 0–0 away draw against Qingdao Jonoon, coming on for Hu Zhaojun in the 80th minute.

Liu returned to Dalian Yifang on a free transfer in February 2017. He played one league match in the 2017 season as Dalian Yifang won the title of the league and promoted back to the first tier. On 24 April 2018, he scored his first senior goal in a 4–1 away win over Liaoning in the 2018 Chinese FA Cup. On 2 May 2018, he played in another FA Cup match against Chongqing Dangdai Lifan with a 1–0 away win.
In February 2019, Liu was loaned to League One side Shanghai Shenxin for the 2019 season.

Career statistics
.

Honours

Club
Dalian Yifang
China League One: 2017

References

External links
 

1993 births
Living people
Chinese footballers
Footballers from Dalian
Dalian Shide F.C. players
Dalian Transcendence F.C. players
Dalian Professional F.C. players
Shanghai Shenxin F.C. players
Beijing Renhe F.C. players
Chinese Super League players
China League One players
Association football defenders